The Guilty is a three-part television drama, broadcast on ITV from 5 to 19 September 2013. The drama stars Tamsin Greig, Darren Boyd and Katherine Kelly, and involves the police investigation into the disappearance of young boy, Callum Reid. In 2008, DCI Maggie Brand (Greig) is tasked with finding the missing boy, while dealing with her own personal problems – but he remains missing. Five years on, Callum's body is recovered and Maggie is determined to discover what happened. The series was subsequently released on DVD in the Netherlands in 2014, but as of 2016, remains unreleased in the UK.

Critical reception
Mark Lawson of The Guardian said of the opening episode: "This maternal parallel brings a fresh depth to the by now standard scenes in which a detective breaks bad news and O'Malley's scripts cleverly lengthen the shadow by making DCI Brand's relationship with her own young son complex and a source of concern and regret to her: it becomes increasingly clear that the title The Guilty may apply to more people than merely the killer of Callum. Director Ed Bazalgette also achieves unusual smoothness in the shifts between now and then. The flashback is a problematic device in crime fiction because it is often used – most grievously in Agatha Christie dramatisations – to convey events that, it turns out later, never happened, but were simply the lying version of a suspect. This always feels a cheat to me: if Dr Arbuthnot never in fact did catch the 7.50 to Didcot, then how were viewers able to see it so vividly as he described his actions to David Suchet?

In The Guilty, though, the two past and present strains of narrative seem to be reliable and exist simultaneously – without any of the visual or musical clues that sometimes signal flashbacks – as they must surely do in the minds of bereaved parents. Tamsin Greig also succeeds in bringing much to a path deeply pitted by the heels of distinguished Equity members. Greig is rather similar to Olivia Colman in having suddenly moved to a new rank of recognition as an actor after years of work in TV comedy. Among her particular qualities are an acerbic edge in the voice and the capacity to suggest deep disappointment and hurt. In The Guilty, the latter aspect underlines the mother-mother storyline, while the former brings an unease to the routine police scenes through the suggestion that soft-voiced compassion or encouragement of colleagues is something at which DCI Brand has to work. It would be almost impossible to create an original police series, but The Guilty impressively manages to leave some new fingerprints on a much-handled form."

Cast
 Tamsin Greig as DCI Maggie Brand
 Arsher Ali as DS Vinesh Roy
 Tom Beard as DSI Alan Reece
 Darren Boyd as Daniel Reid
 Ruta Gedmintas as Teresa Morgan
 Katherine Kelly as Claire Reid
 Linda Marlowe as Lynn Brand
 Jade Ogugua as DC Lenny Jackson
 David Pusey as DC Max Cauldwell
 Pooky Quesnel as Ruth Hide
 Jay Simspon as DS Ron Singer
 Alan Williams as Frank Lawson
 Nicola Thorp as Miss Brenner
 Daniel Runacres-Grundstrom as Callum Reid
 Tommy Potten as Sam Colman
 Jude Foley as Older Luke Reid
 Teddy Fitzpatrick as Young Luke Reid

Episodes

Worldwide release

References

External links

2013 British television series debuts
2013 British television series endings
2010s British crime drama television series
2010s British mystery television series
2010s British television miniseries
Detective television series
English-language television shows
ITV crime dramas
ITV miniseries
Television series by Hartswood Films
Television shows set in Manchester